HMS Dartmouth was a 50-gun fourth-rate ship of the line of the Royal Navy, launched on 3 March 1698 at Southampton.

Career
She was rebuilt according to the 1706 Establishment at Woolwich Dockyard, relaunched on 7 August 1716 and formed part of the naval task force sent to Scotland to help subdue the Jacobite rising of 1719. On 8 October 1736, Dartmouth was ordered to be taken to pieces at Woolwich and rebuilt according to the 1733 proposals of the 1719 Establishment. She was relaunched on 22 April 1741.

Fate
Dartmouth blew up, killing most of her crew, near Cape St Vincent on 8 October 1747 in action with the Spanish ship of the line Glorioso.

See also
Voyage of the Glorioso

Notes

References

 Lavery, Brian (2003) The Ship of the Line - Volume 1: The development of the battlefleet 1650-1850. Conway Maritime Press. .

External links
 

 

Ships of the line of the Royal Navy
1690s ships
Shipwrecks in the Atlantic Ocean
Maritime incidents in 1747
Naval magazine explosions